Bosön is a sports complex on Lidingö outside Stockholm in Sweden, and the headquarters for the Swedish Sports Confederation. Several Swedish national teams have annual training camps at Bosön.

External links
Bosöns sports training and education center, website.

Sports venues in Stockholm